Maclura tricuspidata is a tree native to East Asia, occasionally grown for its fruit, somewhat similar to that of the related mulberry (Morus spp.).  It is also known by common names including cudrang, kujibbong, storehousebush, mandarin melon berry, silkworm thorn, zhe or che, and Chinese mulberry (but not to be confused with Morus australis also known by that name).  It grows up to 6 m high.

The Tanzhe Temple west of Beijing, China is named for this tree.

Fossil record
Fossils similar to Maclura tricuspidata have been collected from the Eocene of France, Miocene of Bulgaria, Pliocene of China and Quaternary of Japan.

References

External links 
 Nanjing University Plant Resources Network (in Chinese, with photo)
 Plants for a Future database

tricuspidata
Trees of China
Taxa named by Élie-Abel Carrière